The Perse School is a public school (English fee-charging day and, in the case of the Perse, a former boarding school) in Cambridge, England. Founded in 1615 by Stephen Perse, its motto is Qui facit per alium facit per se, taken to mean 'He who does things for others does them for himself'. The School began accepting girls at 11 and 13+ in September 2010 and was fully co-educational by September 2012. 'Perse' is a member of the Headmasters' and Headmistresses' Conference, an association of the leading UK independent schools.

The organisation now comprises three schools, which together provide for children aged 3 through to 18. The Pelican is the Perse's nursery and pre-preparatory school, and accommodates pupils from 3–7. It is situated on Glebe Road, close to the main school site. Preparatory education for students aged 7 to 11 years old is provided by the Perse Prep, which is located close to the Upper School, just north of the junction of Long Road and Trumpington Road. In Year 7 pupils usually progress to the Upper School, where they sit GCSE or IGCSE examinations and A-Levels.

History
The school was founded in 1615 at its original site in Free School Lane, Cambridge. Its former buildings now house the Whipple Museum of the History of Science.

Over 300 years later in 1960, the school moved to the site it now occupies as its 'Upper' school on Hills Road. There have been multiple phases of expansion, particularly in the 21st century. Among notable developments is the Peter Hall Performing Arts Centre, a 400-seat theatre, exhibition and rehearsal space designed by architects Haworth Tompkins, which opened in 2018.

An old prospectus lists the fees as £3 per term in 1890.

From 1945 to 1976 it was a direct grant grammar school, offering free places to 40% of pupils. Following the abolition of the Assisted Places Scheme, The Perse no longer received any state funding and became independent.

The school was ranked 13th in the Sunday Times Parent Power league table in 2019 and 6th in the Daily Telegraph national table of A Level, Pre-U and IB results with 83% A* and A grades from 175 candidates. In 2021, The Sunday Times also named The Perse School as the top independent secondary school in East Anglia, as the school had the best performance in the GCE A Level Examinations in the region.

Motto
The school motto is Qui facit per alium facit per se, usually taken to mean "He who does things for others does them for himself". This is an example of a rebus motto, the Latin sentence ending in a word play on the founder's name "per se" and his benefaction. A blue plaque dedicated to the school's founder, Dr Stephen Perse, was installed in Free School Lane, Cambridge.

Competitions, Olympiads and scholarships
Pupils have competed and scored highly in academic competitions and Olympiads, in addition to winning awards including Arkwright Engineering Scholarships and Nuffield Research Placements (previously Nuffield Science Bursaries). Students have won scholarships for summer placements at the Weizmann Institute of Science in Israel and research institutes in Heidelberg, Germany.

British competition results include:
First place in the Pi Wars robot competition
First place in the Schools' Challenge general knowledge competition
First place (winning the Trinity College prize) in the National Cipher Challenge
First place in the Bank of England Target Two Point Zero interest rate challenge
Invitation to the British Physics Olympiad presentation afternoon (top 4 in the country in the AS Challenge)
Qualifying for the UKMT Team Maths Challenge final (winning the poster competition)
Qualifying for the British Informatics Olympiad final (top 15 in the country)
Qualifying for Round 2 (top 20 to 25 in the country) of the UK Chemistry Olympiad
Scoring Gold in Round 1 of United Kingdom Linguistics Olympiad

Students have also competed in international competitions including the International Mathematical Olympiad, the Balkan Mathematical Olympiad, the European Girls' Mathematical Olympiad, the Romanian Master of Mathematics competition, the International Biology Olympiad, the International Olympiad in Informatics, the International Linguistics Olympiad, the International Olympiad on Astronomy and Astrophysics, the International Rocketry Challenge, the European Union Contest for Young Scientists and the Intel International Science and Engineering Fair.

Innovation 
In 2018, The Perse School partnered with a Cambridge-based education technology entrepreneur, Rob Percival, to support the creation of an online artificial intelligence maths teaching platform. Blutick in association with The Perse School, exhibited at the BETT Show in London, 2019 to launch a free beta version.

Developments
The Perse School began accepting girls at 11+ and 13+ in September 2010 and became fully co-educational in September 2012 .

Since 2020, The Perse School Cambridge International (TPSCI) has liaised with partners to open up The Perse international schools outside of England. Currently, two international schools have been set up, namely The Perse School Singapore (opened in Jan 2020) and The Perse School Suzhou in China (opened in Sep 2021).

Headmaster's blog
On his blog the headmaster, Ed Elliott, described his 'ten second challenge' in which he would give students who "commit occasional minor misdemeanours (such as forgetting a book) the opportunity to talk their way out of a punishment". The story was quickly picked up by the mainstream media who reported that pupils were "let off punishment for clever excuses".

Notable Perseans

Academia
Maurice Bloch, anthropologist
Harold James, professor of history and international relations
W. E. Johnson, logician
F. R. Leavis, literary critic
Michael Loewe, sinologist
Edward Henry Palmer, orientalist
G. L. S. Shackle, economist
E. H. Warmington, classicist

Art
Thomas P. Campbell, director of the Metropolitan Museum of Art

Business
David Tang, Hong Kong-based entrepreneur

Engineering
Arthur Marshall, aviation engineer
Anthony Michell, hydraulic engineer

Film and theatre
Ranjit Bolt, translator and playwright
Marius Goring, actor
Peter Hall, founder of the Royal Shakespeare Company
Humphrey Jennings, film director
Matthew Lloyd, theatre director, Royal Exchange, Manchester
Colin McFarlane, actor
Jeremy Silberston, film director

Law
Mark Potter, Appeal Court judge and President of the Family Division

Media

Simon Akam, author, writing on military history and the British Army since 9/11
Mel Calman, cartoonist
Rodney Dale, writer and publisher
John Gross, critic and editor
Tom Harwood, journalist for Guido Fawkes, The Daily Telegraph and GB News
Tom Rosenthal (publisher) (1935–2014), publisher and art critic
Mark Saggers, BBC sports broadcaster

Military
Group Captain William Neil McKechnie, George Cross recipient
Ralph Lilley Turner MC, 2nd/3rd Queen Alexandra's Own Gurkha Rifles

Music
Pete Atkin, singer/songwriter
David Gilmour, singer/songwriter and guitarist of Pink Floyd
Spike Hughes, jazz musician and journalist
Ronnie Ross, jazz musician
John Woolford, first boyfriend of Benjamin Britten

Politics
Anthony Browne, Conservative MP for South Cambridgeshire
Rajani Palme Dutt, leading figure in the Communist Party of Great Britain
Julian Huppert, Liberal Democrat MP for Cambridge 2010-2015
David Steiner, New York State Commissioner of Education
Donald Tebbit, diplomat, British High Commissioner to Australia
Quentin Thomas, civil servant, head of the British Board of Film Classification

Religion
John Polkinghorne, physicist and theologian
Bishop Jeremy Taylor, an influence on the foundation of Methodism

Science
Gustav Victor Rudolf Born, pharmacologist
Sarah Martins Da Silva, gynaecologist and scientist
Associate Professor Anthony Lowe, mathematical physicist and actuary
Brian G. Marsden, astronomer
Ronald G. W. Norrish, Nobel Prize in Chemistry in 1967
George Paget Thomson, Nobel Prize in Physics in 1937

Sport
Zaman Akhter, cricketer
Charles Clayton, cricketer
Owen Giles, Northampton Saints rugby union player
Alex Coles, Northamption Saints rugby union player
Horace Gray, cricketer
Richard Hesketh, cricketer
Tess Howard, field hockey player
Reimell Ragnauth, cricketer

Staff

Headmasters 
 George Griffith, MA - died 1686
 Frederick Heppenstall, MA - 1864 to 1874
 Dr W. H. D. Rouse, MA, LittD (Cantab) - 1902 to 1928. Formerly a fellow of Christ's College, Cambridge
 H. A. Wootton - 1928 to 1945
 Stanley Stubbs, MA - 1945 to 1969. Formerly a housemaster at Gresham's School
 Anthony E. Melville - 1969 to 1987. Formerly senior history master at Haileybury
 Dr Martin Stephen - 1987 to 1994. Subsequently, High Master of Manchester Grammar School from 1994 to 2004 and then St Paul's School from 2004 to 2011. Director of Education for GEMS Education UK. Non-Executive Chairman of the Clarendon Academies Group
 Dr Nigel P. V. Richardson - 1994 to 2008. Headmaster of The Dragon School from 1989 to 1992. Chairman of the Headmasters' and Headmistresses' Conference in 2007. Governor of Magdalen College School and Haileybury. AGBIS board member. Author of the biography Thring of Uppingham: Victorian Educator
 Mr Edward C. Elliott, MA - 2008 onwards. Joined the school in 1997 as head of sixth form and was senior deputy head before being appointed headmaster

Notable staff 
 Henry Caldwell Cook, (1886–1939) educationalist
Frederick Crossfield Happold DSO (Cantab.)
Lilly Frazer (1854/5 – 1941) French teacher and writer
Glenn Kirkham, captain of the England national field hockey team and Perse's Director of Sport in September 2017.
Helen Richardson Walsh, hockey gold medalist

References

External links 
 
 School Roll of Honour for the World Wars

1615 establishments in England
Educational institutions established in the 1610s
Private schools in Cambridgeshire
Schools in Cambridge
Member schools of the Headmasters' and Headmistresses' Conference